Garcon Point is an unincorporated community and census-designated place in Santa Rosa County, Florida, United States. Its population was 457 as of the 2020 census. The community is located on the peninsula of the same name.

Geography

Demographics
Garcon Point, Florida has a population of 457 as of the 2020 US Census.

See also 
 Garcon Point Bridge

References

Unincorporated communities in Santa Rosa County, Florida
Unincorporated communities in Florida
Census-designated places in Santa Rosa County, Florida
Census-designated places in Florida